Diamond-Star Motors (DSM) was an automobile-manufacturing joint venture between the Chrysler Corporation and Mitsubishi Motors Corporation (MMC). The name came from the parent companies' respective logos: three diamonds (Mitsubishi) and a pentastar (Chrysler). Diamond-Star Motors was officially renamed Mitsubishi Motor Manufacturing of America, Inc. (MMMA) in 1995, four years after Mitsubishi took sole control of the plant, and from 2002 to 2016 its official name had been Mitsubishi Motors North America, Inc. (MMNA) Manufacturing Division.

In the automotive enthusiast community, DSM, especially used in the singular (e.g. a DSM) generally refers to the original first- and second-generation Mitsubishi Eclipse, Eagle Talon, and Plymouth Laser, which all shared the same Diamond-Star Motors vehicle platform.

History

Background
The origins of Diamond-Star Motors can be traced back to 1970 when Chrysler Corporation took a 15 percent stake in Mitsubishi Motors, as part of MMC's strategy of expansion through alliances with foreign partners. The U.S. company began distributing Mitsubishis as Chrysler-, Dodge-, and Plymouth-branded captive imports (e.g. Dodge Colt), a successful venture as the compact cars met consumer demand for smaller and more fuel-efficient vehicles in the 1970s, filling a gap at the bottom of the Chrysler group's range.

By 1982, Chrysler was importing 110,000 Mitsubishis annually. However, a minor conflict was forming as the Japanese now wanted to sell directly through their own-branded dealerships. A voluntary import quota system was in place at this time, restricting the number of cars Japanese automakers could bring into the U.S. As the Japanese company began to open its own branded dealerships to sell directly, every imported Cordia, Tredia, and Starion sold by Mitsubishi had to be discounted from Chrysler's allocation. Another point of contention was that Chrysler had the right of first refusal of any Mitsubishi automobiles in the US market until 1990.

Incorporation

In order to circumvent this, the two partners officially incorporated Diamond-Star Motors in October 1985. An incentive package worth US$274 million, and an intense and controversial lobbying effort by state and local government authorities, meant that Illinois won the new auto plant, and in April 1986 ground was broken on a  production facility in the town of Normal. The plant was completed in March 1988, with an annual capacity of 240,000 vehicles.  In 1989, the workers at the plant formed United Auto Workers Local 2488, and signed their first contract with the company.

Initially, three models were produced at this facility. The Mitsubishi Eclipse, Plymouth Laser, and Eagle Talon were smaller 2+2 sports cars on a new co-designed platform. Models subsequently produced during the next decade included the Mitsubishi Mirage/Dodge/Plymouth Colt/Eagle Summit sedans, the Mitsubishi Galant, the Dodge Avenger Coupe/Chrysler Sebring Coupe, and the Dodge Stratus Coupe.

Departure of Chrysler
Initially Diamond-Star Motors was a 50-50 joint venture between Chrysler and Mitsubishi. However, in 1991 the Japanese company purchased its partner's interest, and thereafter the manufacture of Chrysler vehicles was on a contractual basis. Chrysler sold its equity stake to Mitsubishi in 1993, and Diamond-Star Motors was renamed Mitsubishi Motors Manufacturing America (MMMA) on July 1, 1995. Despite the departure, the two companies have maintained various co-operative manufacturing agreements since and considered all vehicle produced until 1995 as Diamond Star Motors.

Formerly, the plant produced vehicles using the American-developed Mitsubishi PS platform, including the Endeavor, Galant, and Eclipse. In mid-2012, the plant began producing the Mitsubishi ASX which is sold in United States as the Outlander Sport. Approximately 1,900 people worked in the highly mechanized plant, alongside approximately 1,000 robots.

Closure 
In July 2015, Mitsubishi announced that it would end production at the plant in Normal. The plant had been operating well below capacity for several years.  In 2014, it produced just over 61,000 vehicles out of a capacity of 240,000 vehicles annually. Production would shift to Japan, with Mitsubishi importing all vehicles sold in North America. Mitsubishi said it would try to sell the plant to preserve jobs, but that the plant would be closed by November if no buyer was found.  Ultimately a buyer was not found in time, and production ended on the 30th of November.  Most of the workers (900 out of 1200) were let go on that date, with the rest staying to build replacement parts until the final closure of the plant in May 2016.  Eventually the plant was sold to Maynards Industries, an auctioning and liquidation firm, with ownership to transfer June 1, 2016.

Currently, the facility is owned by American electric vehicle startup Rivian, which in 2017 acquired the plant and its contents for $16 million.

Production

(source: MMNA Production History and Facts and Figures 2016)

References

Buildings and structures completed in 1988
Vehicle manufacturing companies established in 1985
Vehicle manufacturing companies disestablished in 2015
Mitsubishi Motors factories
Companies based in Bloomington–Normal
Joint ventures
Motor vehicle assembly plants in Illinois
Chrysler factories
1985 establishments in Illinois
2015 disestablishments in Illinois